Ezra E. H. Griffith (born 1942 in Barbados) is an American psychiatrist.  Griffith is Professor Emeritus of and Senior Research Scientist in Psychiatry; Deputy Chair for Diversity and Organizational Ethics, Department of Psychiatry at the Yale University School of Medicine and Emeritus Professor of African  and African-American Studies at Yale University.

Biography

When Griffith was 14 the family immigrated to New York City where he attended Boys High School (Brooklyn).  His father was a pastor. He graduated from Harvard College in 1963. He served with the American army in Vietnam. Griffith earned his M.D. degree from the University of Strasbourg in 1973.

Griffith completed his residency in psychiatry at the Albert Einstein College of Medicine, then joined the faculty of the Yale University School of Medicine.

Griffith's fields of academic interest include cultural psychiatrist and ethnic identity; racial conflict; forensic  psychiatry;  psychiatry and  religion; community psychiatry and administrative psychiatry.

Griffith has served as President of the Connecticut District Branch of the American Psychiatric Association, the American Board of Forensic Psychiatry, the Black Psychiatrists of America, the American Academy of Psychiatry and the Law, and the American Orthopsychiatric Association.

Books
 I'm Your Father, Boy - A Family Memoir of Barbados, 2004
 Race and Excellence: My Dialogue with Chester Pierce, 1998
 Ye shall dream: Patriarch Granville Williams and the Barbados Spiritual Baptists, 2010, University of the West Indies Press
 Clinical guidelines in cross-cultural mental health, 1988

References

American psychiatrists
Yale University faculty
Harvard College alumni
1942 births
Living people
University of Strasbourg alumni
Barbadian emigrants to the United States
Boys High School (Brooklyn) alumni